José Cardó Guarderas is a Peruvian and was Reconstrucción Democrática's presidential candidate for the 2006 national election. He formally withdrew his candidacy two days before the election, publicly supporting Lourdes Flores' one instead, but the ballot was not changed and his votes were still counted officially. He received 0.1% of the vote, coming in 17th place.

External links
site

Living people
Democratic Reconstruction politicians
Candidates for President of Peru
Year of birth missing (living people)
Place of birth missing (living people)